Xəlfələr (also, Khalfalar and Khal’fyalyar) is a village and municipality in the Masally Rayon of Azerbaijan.  It has a population of 660.

References 

 (no obvious tie at reference to subject of this article)

Populated places in Masally District